Michael Price (born 6 October 1981) is a South African former first-class cricketer who played for the Warriors cricket team.

References

External links
 

1981 births
Living people
South African cricketers
Warriors cricketers
Eastern Province cricketers
People from Makhanda, Eastern Cape
Cricketers from the Eastern Cape